Paola Protopapa (born 6 May 1965) is a former Italian Paralympic rower, Alpine skier and sailor who competed in international level events.

In 1987, Protopapa lost the use of her left elbow after an accident which caused her to have elbow disarticulation.

Achievements

References

External links
 

1965 births
Living people
Sportspeople from Rome
Paralympic alpine skiers of Italy
Paralympic rowers of Italy
Italian female skiers
Rowers at the 2008 Summer Paralympics
Alpine skiers at the 2010 Winter Paralympics
Sailors at the 2012 Summer Paralympics
Medalists at the 2008 Summer Paralympics
Paralympic medalists in rowing
Paralympic gold medalists for Italy
21st-century Italian women